The Cambridge Public Library in Cambridge, Massachusetts is part of the Minuteman Library Network. It consists of a main library and six branches, located throughout the city. Having developed from the Cambridge Athenaeum, the main library building was built in 1888, and was expanded and renovated in 2009. This expansion greatly increased the area of the building, more than tripling the square footage. 

In fiscal year 2014, the city of Cambridge spent 1.63% ($7,064,381) of its budget on the library, $66 per person.

Main building

The main building of the Cambridge Public Library is an historic library building at 449 Broadway. It was built in 1888 with land and full construction funding donated by Frederick H. Rindge, a Cambridge native and philanthropist. Its Richardsonian Romanesque design was by Van Brunt & Howe.  The building was added to the National Register of Historic Places in 1982.

A $90 million expansion and renovation of the library, led by the Boston architectural firms William Rawn Associates and Ann Beha Architects, opened on November 8, 2009. The new addition more than tripled the square footage of the building, and is the first building in the US to make use of European Double-Skin Curtainwall technology. Architectural drawings and construction photos are available here.  During most of the construction, the library collection had been relocated to the Longfellow School.

The surrounding lawn of the main building is a popular meeting place for various interest groups, including pickup soccer, slacklining, book and religious study groups, casual picnics, and the traditional practice of various martial & therapeutic arts.

Museum of Science Community Solar System 
Prior to the renovation of the main library, the library was home to a scale model of the planet Saturn in the Boston Museum of Science's community-wide solar system model. Saturn was located just outside the portion of the building that housed the old stacks, roughly where the computer workstation sign-in table is currently located.  The Saturn model was packed up and shipped back to the Museum of Science and was not positioned at the reopened renovated library.  Other locations in Cambridge that still have models in the historic nine planet series are the Royal Sonesta Hotel (home of Earth) and the CambridgeSide mall (home of Mars).

History of organization
The Cambridge Public Library developed out of the Cambridge Athenaeum, which was founded in 1849 as "a lyceum, public library, and reading room with a building on the corner of Massachusetts Avenue and Pleasant Street where Cambridge residents could borrow books at the cost of one dollar per year.

The City of Cambridge acquired the Cambridge Athenaeum in 1858 and renamed it the Dana Library for use as a city hall and a public library. By 1866 the Library moved to the corner of Massachusetts Avenue and Temple Street. In 1874, the library became free to the public and was renamed the Cambridge Public. The main building of the Cambridge Public Library at 449 Broadway was built in 1888.

Branches
Six smaller neighborhood branch libraries are scattered throughout the City of Cambridge. These are:
Boudreau Branch, 245 Concord Avenue, West Cambridge
Central Square Branch, 45 Pearl Street, Cambridgeport
Collins Branch, 64 Aberdeen Avenue, West Cambridge
O'Connell Branch, 48 Sixth Street, East Cambridge
O'Neill Branch, 70 Rindge Avenue, North Cambridge
Valente Branch, 826 Cambridge Street, East Cambridge

See also 
 List of public libraries in Massachusetts
 National Register of Historic Places listings in Cambridge, Massachusetts

References

Further reading
 Catalogue of the Cambridge Public Library, 1887.
 The Cambridge Public Library: Its history, rules and regulations, list of officers, past and present, etc. Cambridge, Mass.: J. Wilson and son, 1891
 "Cambridge." Report of the Free Public Library Commission of Massachusetts. 1891
 Annual report. 1893-1904
 Cambridge Public Library Bulletin v.1-v.2 (1896-1897)

External links

 Cambridge Public Library Website
 Main Library Expansion Project

Library buildings completed in 1888
Public libraries in Massachusetts
Libraries on the National Register of Historic Places in Massachusetts
Buildings and structures in Cambridge, Massachusetts
Libraries in Middlesex County, Massachusetts
National Register of Historic Places in Cambridge, Massachusetts
library